Linzi District is a district of the prefecture-level city of Zibo, in central Shandong province, China. Located near the Shengli Oil Field, Linzi's economy is driven by petro-chemical refinery. Wheat, corn and cotton are cultivated in the rural areas surrounding the urban center.

The ruins of Ancient Linzi located in the northwest of the district, was the site of the ancient State of Qi's capital.

Linzi is one of the most highly developed industrial districts in north China with the highest GDP in Shandong Province.

Administrative divisions

As 2012, this District is divided to 5 subdistricts, 7 towns  and 1 township.
Subdistricts

Towns

Townships
 Bianhe Township

Climate

People from Linzi

Zuo Si, poet of the Western Jin
Zuo Fen, poet of the Western Jin

References

External links

County-level divisions of Shandong
Zibo